The 1977 Cork Senior Hurling Championship was the 89th staging of the Cork Senior Hurling Championship since its establishment by the Cork County Board in 1887. The draw for the opening fixtures took place on 30 January 1977. The championship began on 1 May 1977 and ended on 18 September 1977.

Glen Rovers entered the championship as the defending champions.

The final was played on 18 September 1977 at Páirc Uí Chaoimh in Cork, between St. Finbarr's and Glen Rovers, in what was their first meeting in the final in 10 years. St. Finbarr's won the match by 1-17 to 1-05 to claim their 19th championship title overall and a first title in three years. The attendance of 34,151 at the final remains a record.

Bandon's Noel  Crowley was the championship's top scorer with 2-16.

Team changes

From Championship

Regraded to the Cork Intermediate Hurling Championship
 Ballinhassig

Results

First round

Second round

Quarter-finals

Semi-finals

Final

Championship statistics

Top scorers

Overall

In a single game

Miscellaneous

 Patrick Murphy, the honorary secretary of the Blackrock club, collapsed and died in the stand at Páirc Uí Chaoimh while watching the championship semi-final between St. Finbarr's and Blackrock.
 The attendance of 34,151 at the county final remains an all-time record.

References

Cork Senior Hurling Championship
Cork Senior Hurling Championship